At the 1896 Summer Olympics, one wrestling event was contested. It was organized and prepared by the Sub-Committee for Wrestling and Gymnastics. Five competitors from four nations competed.

Medal summary
These medals are retroactively assigned by the International Olympic Committee; at the time, winners were given a silver medal and subsequent places received no award.

Participating nations
A total of 5 wrestlers from 4 nations competed at the Athens Games:

Medal table

Sub-Committee for Wrestling and Gymnastics
 Joan. Phokianos, president
 George Streit, secretary
 Joan. Yenissarlis
 Loukas Belos
 Nic. Politis
 Chas. Waldstein
 Dimitri Aighinitis
 Dim. Sekkeris
 Spiridon Comoundouros
 Const. Manos
 Sp. Antonopoulos

See also
List of World and Olympic Champions in men's freestyle wrestling
List of World and Olympic Champions in Greco-Roman wrestling

References
  (Digitally available at )
  (Excerpt available at )
 

 
1896 Summer Olympics events
1896